The Kisii Teaching and Referral Hospital is a public hospital in Kisii, Kisii County, Kenya.  It is the largest hospital in Kisii County and is accredited at Level 6 by the Kenyan Ministry of Health.

History
The hospital was started during World War I to care for wounded.  It served as a district hospital for many years.  It was upgraded to a Level 5 hospital in 2007 and to a Level 6 hospital in 2014.  The hospital is partnered with the Kisii University School of Medicine.

Facilities
The hospital provides full inpatient services with 650 beds, including oncology, renal analysis, palliative care, and CT/MRI scanning services.

References

External Links 
 Official Website (Archived)

Hospitals in Kenya
Kisumu